Marco Büchel (born 30 August 1979) is a retired Liechtenstein football midfielder.

References

1979 births
Living people
Liechtenstein footballers
FC Balzers players
Association football midfielders
Liechtenstein international footballers